Cruz del Sur pipeline is a natural gas pipeline linking Buenos Aires in Argentina with Colonia del Sacramento and Montevideo in Uruguay.

History
Construction of the pipeline started in March 2001.  The pipeline was completed in November 2002 and it was inaugurated by the presidents of Uruguay and Argentina, Jorge Batlle Ibáñez and Eduardo Duhalde on 29 November 2002 in Montevideo.

Technical description
It cost US$150 millions.

The pipeline is supplied from the gas fields in the Neuquén Basin.

Operator
It operated by Gasoducto Cruz del Sur S.A. and owned by consortium of BG Group (40%), Pan American Energy (30%), ANCAP (20%) and Wintershall Dea (10%).

Proposed expansion
There is a proposal to prolong the pipeline to southern Brazil. In Rio Grande do Sul, it would be linked with the GASBOL pipeline.

See also

 GasAndes Pipeline
 Paraná–Uruguaiana pipeline
 Yabog pipeline

References

External links
 Gasoducto Cruz del Sur S.A.

Energy infrastructure completed in 2002
Natural gas pipelines in Argentina
Natural gas pipelines in Uruguay
Argentina–Uruguay relations
2002 establishments in Argentina
2002 establishments in Uruguay